Barbara Renee Turner (born June 8, 1984) is a former American professional basketball player currently working as an assistant coach for the Atlanta Dream of the Women's National Basketball Association (WNBA). She acquired US / Turkish dual citizenship while playing in Turkey; her name in Turkish is spelled Bahar Öztürk.

High school
Born and raised in Cleveland, Ohio, Turner played for East Technical High School in Cleveland, where she was named a WBCA All-American. She participated in the 2002 WBCA High School All-America Game where she scored thirteen points.

College
In her last NCAA Tournament run, Barbara Turner was unable to get her Connecticut team back to the pinnacle of women's college basketball after helping UConn win NCAA Championships in 2003 and 2004. The Huskies' 2006 Final Four bid fell short in overtime against Duke in the Elite Eight, with Turner unable to play down the stretch because of debilitating cramps.

USA Basketball
Turner was named to the team representing the US at the 2003 Pan American Games. The team lost the opening game to Cuba, then rebounded to win their next five games, including an overtime win against Brazil. They then faced Cuba for the gold medal, falling short 75–64 to take home the silver medal. Turner averaged 5.4 points per game.

College highlights
 2003 Big East All-Rookie Team
 2004 All-Big East Second Team
 2005 All-Big East Honorable Mention
 2005 Most Outstanding of Big East Tournament
 2005 Big East All-Tournament Team

WNBA career
Turner's dominant postseason - she averaged 22.8 points and 10.5 rebounds in the NCAA Tournament - secured her a spot in the first round of the 2006 WNBA Draft when Turner was taken 11th overall by the Seattle Storm. She quickly made the transition from power forward to small forward in the WNBA, starting 9 games as a rookie and appearing in all 34 games during the 2006 season, averaging 6.4 points, 2.5 rebounds and 1.4 assists.

On May 16, 2007, Turner was waived by the Seattle Storm, and two weeks later she was signed by the Houston Comets. During the 2007 season, Turner played in 22 games, averaging 4.2 points and 1.9 rebounds.

On March 6, 2008, Turner was re-signed by the Comets, then traded to the Connecticut Sun in exchange for Megan Mahoney.

European career
2006    :  A.S. Ramat-Hasharon
2006–2007:  Fenerbahçe Istanbul
2008–2009:  Tarsus Belediyesi
2009–2010:  Mersin Büyükşehir Belediyesi
2010–2012:  Kayseri Kaski S.K.
2012–2013:  Mersin Büyükşehir Belediyesi
2013–2014:  Botaş SK
2014 Galatasaray OdeaBank,
2014–2015:  Orduspor
2015–2018:  Hatay BŞB

Vital statistics
Position: Small Forward
Height: 6 ft 0 in (1.83 m)
High School: East Technical High School in Cleveland, Ohio
College: University of Connecticut
Team(s): Seattle Storm 2006, Houston Comets 2007, Connecticut Sun 2008

Coaching career
On September 26, 2021, Turner joined the Houston Rockets coaching staff as a player development coach.

Awards 
 Ohio Ms. Basketball (2004) awarded by Ohio High School Basketball Coaches Association

University of Connecticut statistics

See also
 Connecticut Huskies women's basketball
 List of Connecticut women's basketball players with 1000 points
 2003–04 Connecticut Huskies women's basketball team

Notes

External links
WNBA Player Profile
WNBA Prospect Profile
Seattle Storm Profile

1984 births
Living people
Abdullah Gül Üniversitesi basketball players
American emigrants to Turkey
American expatriate basketball people in Turkey
American women's basketball players
American people of Turkish descent
Basketball players at the 2003 Pan American Games
Basketball players from Cleveland
Bendigo Spirit players
Botaş SK players
Fenerbahçe women's basketball players
Galatasaray S.K. (women's basketball) players
Hatay Büyükşehir Belediyesi (women's basketball) players
Houston Comets players
Houston Rockets assistant coaches
Mersin Büyükşehir Belediyesi women's basketball players
Naturalized citizens of Turkey
Seattle Storm draft picks
Seattle Storm players
Small forwards
Turkish people of African-American descent
UConn Huskies women's basketball players
Pan American Games competitors for the United States
United States women's national basketball team players